The Aleksandrov-Kalinin AK-1 was a prototype airliner built in the Soviet Union in the early 1920s, designed as part of a project by TsAGI to investigate low-cost construction techniques and to verify calculation models for thick-section airfoils. It was a high-wing, strut-braced monoplane of conventional design, powered by a single engine in the nose. Two passengers could be carried in an enclosed cabin in the fuselage, while a separate enclosed cockpit was provided for the pilot, plus a co-pilot or an additional passenger. Construction was wooden throughout.

The aircraft was assembled at the GAZ-5 factory during 1923 and flight testing began in February the following year. Money for the project had been donated by the Latvian Riflemen, and the AK-1 was named Латышский стрелок (Latyshskii Strelok - "Latvian Sharpshooter") in recognition of this. Following flight tests, it was handed over to Dobrolyot, who used it on a route between Moscow and Kazan. In 1925, it was used in a propaganda flight from Moscow to Beijing and other Chinese cities, flying  in 38 days.

Operators

Dobrolyot

Specifications

References

 

 Уголок неба
 Russian Aviation Museum

1920s Soviet and Russian airliners
Kalinin aircraft
Aircraft first flown in 1924